The following is a list of clubs who have played in the Eliteserien since its establishment as a one-group top flight in 1963 to the current season. All statistics here refer to time in the Norwegian top flight only, with the exception of 'Most Recent Finish' (which refers to all levels of play) and 'Last Promotion' (which refers to the club's last promotion from the second tier of Norwegian football). For the 'Top Scorer' column, those in bold still play in the Eliteserien for the club shown. Eliteserien teams playing in the 2022 season are indicated in bold.

As of the end of the 2022 season, a total of 48 teams have played in the Eliteserien since 1963.

Table

References

Clubs